Leepertown Township is one of twenty-five townships in Bureau County, Illinois, USA. As of the 2020 census, its population was 333 and it contained 164 housing units. Leepertown Township changed its name from Leipertown Township on an unknown date.

Geography

Cities
 Bureau Junction
 De Pue (southwest edge)

Cemeteries
The township contains Greenwood Cemetery.

Major highways
  Interstate 180
  Illinois Route 26
  Illinois Route 29

Rivers
 Illinois River

Lakes
 Goose Lake
 Hickory Ridge Lake
 Lower Spring Lake
 Spring Lake

Demographics
As of the 2020 census there were 333 people, 91 households, and 61 families residing in the township. The racial makeup of the township was 86.19% White, 0.00% African American, 0.30% Native American, 0.30% Asian, 0.00% Pacific Islander, 1.20% from other races, and 12.01% from two or more races. Hispanic or Latino of any race were 9.01% of the population.

There were 91 households, out of which 25.30% had children under the age of 18 living with them, 40.66% were married couples living together, 12.09% had a female householder with no spouse present, and 32.97% were non-families. 14.30% of all households were made up of individuals, and 12.10% had someone living alone who was 65 years of age or older. The average household size was 2.95 and the average family size was 3.10.

The township's age distribution consisted of 18.7% under the age of 18, 13.1% from 18 to 24, 23.5% from 25 to 44, 32.8% from 45 to 64, and 11.9% who were 65 years of age or older. The median age was 39.8 years. For every 100 females, there were 100.0 males. For every 100 females age 18 and over, there were 83.2 males.

The median income for a household in the township was $67,813, and the median income for a family was $72,250. Males had a median income of $41,250 versus $24,500 for females. The per capita income for the township was $27,346. About 0.0% of families and 8.5% of the population were below the poverty line, including 22.0% of those under age 18 and 3.1% of those age 65 or over.

School districts
 Depue Community Unit School District 103

Political districts
 Illinois's 11th congressional district
 State House District 76
 State Senate District 38

References
 
 US Census Bureau 2007 TIGER/Line Shapefiles
 US National Atlas

External links
 City-Data.com
 Illinois State Archives

Townships in Bureau County, Illinois
Populated places established in 1849
Townships in Illinois
1849 establishments in Illinois